Logan (stylized LOGAN) is the third studio album by South African rapper and singer Emtee, released by Emtee Records on April 9, 2021, and features guest appearances from Lolli Native, Moozlie, J Smash, Flash Ikumkani as well as Malawian rapper Gwamba. The album was Produced by Ruff and others. Emtee renamed this album after his second born Logan.

The album was preceded by three singles: "Wave", "Logan","Johustleburg", "Brand New Day" featuring Lolli Native. It debuted at number 1 on the Apple Music charts in South Africa.

Critical reception 
Logan generally received positive reviews from music  critics, Sekese Rasephei from OkayAfrica called the album "All in all, LOGAN is a solid addition to Emtee's rich discography".  Unorthodoxs staff said "The project is authentic and executed in true eMtee style with a few surprises that Hip Hop lovers globally will appreciate".

Title 
The albums title was named after his second-born son, Logan.

Awards and nominations

Track listing

References 

2021 albums
Emtee albums